Maxime Cressy was the defending champion but lost in the quarterfinals to Vitaliy Sachko.

Pavel Kotov won the title after defeating Andrea Arnaboldi 6–4, 6–3 in the final.

Seeds

Draw

Finals

Top half

Bottom half

References

External links
Main draw
Qualifying draw

Città di Forlì III - 1